Andoain is a town in the province of Gipuzkoa, in the autonomous community of Basque Country, in the North of Spain. Nowadays it has a population of 14,637 inhabitants (2019), which has been quite stable since the 90s.

Andoain is located where the Oria River meets Leitzaran river, next to the mountains Belkoain and Buruntza.

Andoain is recognized by its green areas surrounding the rivers, which are dense forests, very suitable for hiking and biking (Leizaran Valley).

Geography
Andoain is situated in the Oria valley, closer to Belkoain mountain. The town is surrounded by several mountains: Buruntza (439 m), Belkoain (488 m), Aizkorri (598 m), Usobelartza (647 m) and Adarra (817 m) and the oria river goes throw the city center.

Climate
Andoain experiences an oceanic climate (Köppen climate classification Cfb) with abundant rains during the whole year, and moderate temperature, without extreme hot nor cold. Average annual rain reaches 1700 mm and mean temperature is 14 C.

Demography

Governance

Current town mayor is Maider Lainez Lazcoz from Spanish Socialist Workers' Party.

See also
:Category:People from Andoain

References

External links
 Official website  and Basque.
 ANDOAIN in the Bernardo Estornés Lasa – Auñamendi Encyclopedia (Euskomedia Fundazioa) 

Municipalities in Gipuzkoa